Verkhneuralsky District is an administrative and municipal district (raion), one of the twenty-seven in Chelyabinsk Oblast, Russia. It is located in the west of the oblast. Its administrative center is the town of Verkhneuralsk. Population:  42,121 (2002 Census);  The population of Verkhneuralsk accounts for 26.1% of the district's total population.

References

Notes

Sources

Districts of Chelyabinsk Oblast